Hayataka Maru was used as an auxiliary transport of the Imperial Japanese Navy during World War II.

History
She was laid down on 18 October 1922 by Mitsui Tamano Engineering & Shipbuilding at their Tamano shipyard. She was launched on 9 February 1923, completed on 31 March 1923, and registered in Otaru as Hokkai Maru No. 2. She was renamed Hayataka Maru in 1932 when she was sold to the Teikoku Salvage Co.  Although Lloyd's Register of Shipping lists her as Hayataka Maru, she was also known as Soryu Maru.

Her sister ship was Hokkai Maru No. 1 (renamed ).

References

1923 ships
Maritime incidents in December 1941
World War II shipwrecks in the Pacific Ocean
Ships built by Mitsui Engineering and Shipbuilding
Ships sunk by American submarines
World War II naval ships of Japan
Auxiliary ships of the Imperial Japanese Navy